Quinella  may refer to:

 Quinella (album), an album by the musical group Atlanta Rhythm Section
 Quinella (bacterium), a genus of bacteria in the family Veillonellaceae
 A number of types of bet: see Parimutuel betting